Jessica Kubzansky is an American  theatre director and current artistic director of the Boston Court Pasadena Theatre Company.

Life and career

Kubzansky has directed extensively throughout Southern California and was the 2004 recipient of the Los Angeles Drama Critics Circle Margaret Harford Award for Sustained Excellence. Kubzansky is a graduate of Harvard University, Johns Hopkins University, and the California Institute of the Arts.

Kubzansky has worked extensively across Southern California theatre, directing works with the Laguna Playhouse, Geffen Playhouse, East West Players, Pasadena Playhouse, the Pacific Resident Theatre, and the Los Angeles Theatre Center. Her 2003 Colony Theatre Company production of Lillian Hellman's Toys in the Attic was named "Best Play" by the Los Angeles Ovation Awards.

Directing credits

References

External links 
 Boston Court Pasadena: Jessica Kubzansky

American theatre directors
Women theatre directors
Living people
Johns Hopkins University alumni
California Institute of the Arts alumni
Harvard College alumni
Year of birth missing (living people)